Sharur or Şərur, the capital town and most populous municipality of Sharur Rayon in Nakhchivan Autonomous Republic of Azerbaijan

It may also refer to:
Sharur District or Sharur Rayon, a rayon of Azerbaijan in the Nakhchivan Autonomous Republic
Sharur-Daralagezsky Uyezd, an uyezd of the Erivan Governorate of the Caucasus Viceroyalty of the Russian Empire
Sharur, Iran, a village in Bizineh Rud Rural District, Bizineh Rud District, Khodabandeh County, Zanjan Province, Iran
Sharur (mythological weapon), mythological weapon wielded by the Akkadian god Ninurta

See also
Sharur Turkish High School
Sharu (disambiguation)